Chrysotypus medjensis is a species of moth of the family Thyrididae. It is found in the Democratic Republic of the Congo.

References

Thyrididae
Insects of the Democratic Republic of the Congo
Moths of Africa
Endemic fauna of the Democratic Republic of the Congo